"Stay Together" is a song by American actress and singer Noah Cyrus. It was released on April 14, 2017. The song was written by Cyrus, Emily Warren, and Britt Burton, with production being handled by Digital Farm Animals and Hudson Mohawke.

Critical reception
Idolator's Mike Wass called it "rowdy, relatable and very catchy" as well as a "raucous, rebellious anthem with a massive sing-along chorus" and a "perfect snapshot of teen restlessness and carpe-diem spirit." Tom Breihan of Stereogum compared "Stay Together" to the works of Miley Cyrus and dubbed it Noah's "own attempt at a no-fucks anthem." Entertainment Weeklys Nolan Feeney labeled it a "laid-back, slightly melancholy YOLO anthem." Gabe Bergado of Teen Vogue said "it's totally a song that you'd listen to while dealing with all the feelings after a breakup."

Track listing

Charts

Certifications

Release history

References

2017 singles
2017 songs
Noah Cyrus songs
Songs written by Emily Warren
Songs written by Digital Farm Animals
Songs written by Britt Burton
Songs written by Noah Cyrus
Song recordings produced by Digital Farm Animals